The League of Oran Football Association, also called League of Oran or simply LOFA for a short was an organization of soccer in Algeria to the French colonial era. Founded in 1920 in order to develop the  colonial football  to Oran; She paused for a moment due to World War II, then resumed in 1946. Eventually it will cease all activities in 1962 after the end of the War of Algeria who devoted the independence of the Algeria and which led to the mass exodus of settlers to France signifier abandonment of sports clubs run by the "settlers" and their structures.

Affiliated to the French Football Federation with four other leagues in North Africa that are leagues: the Algiers of Constantine of Tunisia and Morocco; League of Oran so possessed as his four sisters the status of "league" or "Championship" amateur, and had four divisions that corresponded to the seventh, sixth, fifth and fourth division of French football.

These leagues so were the main football regions in North Africa from cutting the French colonial administration. They were very structured and very hierarchical and organized competitions for all age categories in addition to a so-called "corporate" (or category Championship "corporate" or company), the highest level was called Division of Honor .

History

Oran League
The Oran League is champions of Honor Division (DH) of the French league system. It concerne the north west of Algeria, called west of Algeria or Oranie.

Finals
1ère Série -  / USFASA

Division d'honneur LOFA / ULNAF / FFF

Division d'honneur LOFA / FFF

*: No League of Oran played from 1939 to 1941 and from 1943 to 1946 because World War II (1939–1945), Critérium de Guerre Tournament in place but apparently counted for the League of Oran.
From the 1956-57 season, muslim clubs ended their participations in any competition.

Titles by club

Oran Cup

References

External links 
Algeria - List of Champions - rsssf.com

DH Oran
DH Oran
Alg
Defunct organisations based in Algeria